Kristin McGrath (born October 21, 1982) is an American racing cyclist.

References

External links
 

1982 births
Living people
American female cyclists
Place of birth missing (living people)
21st-century American women